Warren is a city in and the county seat of Trumbull County, Ohio, United States. The population was 39,201 at the 2020 census. The historical county seat of the Connecticut Western Reserve, it is the third largest municipality in the Youngstown–Warren metropolitan area after Youngstown and Boardman, and anchors the northern part of that area.

History

Quinby named the town for the town's surveyor, Moses Warren. The town was the county seat of the Western Reserve, then became the Trumbull County seat in 1801. In 1833, Warren contained county buildings, two printing offices, a bank, five mercantile stores, and about 600 inhabitants.

Warren had a population of nearly 1,600 people in 1846. In that same year, the town had five churches, twenty stores, three newspaper offices, one bank, one wool factory and two flourmills. In June 1846, a fire destroyed several buildings on one side of the town square, but residents soon replaced them with new stores and other businesses. Warren became an important center of trade for farmers living in the surrounding countryside during this period. Songwriter Stephen Foster, his wife Jane McDowell, and their daughter Marion lived briefly in Warren.

During the latter decades of the nineteenth century and throughout the twentieth century, Warren remained an important trading and manufacturing center. By 1888, four railroads connected the community with other parts of Ohio. In that same year, there were five newspaper offices, seven churches, three banks and numerous manufacturing firms in Warren. The businesses manufactured a wide variety of products including linseed oil, furniture, barrel staves, wool fabric, blinds, incandescent bulbs, automobiles and carriages; however, the leading companies were the Packard Electric Company and Packard Motor Car Company, both founded in the 1890s in Warren by brothers James Ward Packard and William Doud Packard. Warren was the first town in the U.S. to have an electric street illumination, provided by Packard Electric. Warren's population was 5,973 people in 1890. Construction began on the Trumbull County Courthouse in downtown Warren on Thanksgiving Day, 1895.

Warren continued to grow in the twentieth century. During the late nineteenth and early twentieth centuries, steel production was a major industry in the county because of large deposits of coal and iron ore in surrounding counties. In recent years, many Warren residents have worked in local service and retail sales businesses. In 2000, Warren was Trumbull County's most populated community, with 46,832 residents. Many examples of late 19th and early 20th century architectural styles still stand in downtown Warren, including the Trumbull County Courthouse, which contains one of the largest courtrooms in the state of Ohio, and the Trumbull County Carnegie Law Library; in addition to office buildings, banks, stores, and homes surrounding the Courthouse Square area.

John Ashbery mentions Warren in his poem 'Pyrography', first published in an exhibition catalogue in 1976 and included in his 1977 collection Houseboat Days. In a later interview, Ashbery said he had never visited the town.

Geography

Warren is located at  (41.238206, −80.814554).

Demographics

As of 2015, 95.5% of the population spoke English, 1.6% Greek, 1.1% Spanish, and 0.9% Italian in their homes.

2010 census
As of the census of 2010, there were 41,557 people, 17,003 households, and 10,013 families living in the city. The racial makeup of the city was 67.7% White, 27.7% African American, 0.2% Native American, 0.4% Asian, 0.7% from other races, and 3.3% from two or more races. Hispanic or Latino of any race were 1.9% of the population.

Of the 17,003 households 29.8% had children under the age of 18 living with them, 31.8% were married couples living together, 21.3% had a female householder with no husband present, 5.8% had a male householder with no wife present, and 41.1% were non-families. 35.6% of households were one person and 13.8% were one person aged 65 or older. The average household size was 2.30 and the average family size was 2.97.

The median age was 38.3 years. 23.7% of residents were under the age of 18; 9.3% were between the ages of 18 and 24; 25.2% were from 25 to 44; 25.9% were from 45 to 64; and 16% were 65 or older. The gender makeup of the city was 48.1% male and 51.9% female.

2000 census
At the 2000 census, there were 46,832 people, 19,288 households and 12,035 families living in the city. The population density was 2,912.4 people per square mile (1,124.5/km). There were 21,279 housing units at an average density of 1,322.9 per square mile (510.9/km). The racial makeup of the city was 60.94% White, 36.20% African American, 0.13% Native American, 0.42% Asian, 0.03% Pacific Islander, 0.30% from other races and 1.98% from two or more races. Hispanic or Latino of any race were 1.04% of the population.

Of the 19,288 households 29.5% had children under the age of 18 living with them, 38.4% were married couples living together, 19.4% had a female householder with no husband present and 37.6% were non-families. 32.9% of households were one person and 13.7% were one person aged 65 or older. The average household size was 2.37 and the average family size was 3.01.

The age distribution was 26.3% under the age of 18, 8.6% from 18 to 24, 27.3% from 25 to 44, 21.0% from 45 to 64 and 16.8% 65 or older. The median age was 36 years. For every 100 females, there were 86.8 males. For every 100 females age 18 and over, there were 81.9 males.

The median household income was $30,147 and the median family income  was $36,158. Males had a median income of $32,317 versus $23,790 for females. The per capita income for the city was $16,808. About 16.2% of families and 19.4% of the population were below the poverty line, including 29.8% of those under age 18 and 9.9% of those age 65 or over.

Economy
Major employers in Warren include Trumbull Memorial Hospital, St. Joseph Warren Hospital, the Tribune Chronicle, Seven Seventeen Credit Union, Hillside Rehabilitation Hospital, and Thomas Steel Strip. Top Shelf Coffee is headquartered in Warren.

Recreation
The Trumbull Country Club hosted the Youngstown Kitchens Trumbull Open on the tour in 1960. From 1993 to 2000, Avalon Lakes Golf Club hosted the Giant Eagle LPGA Classic golf tournament on the LPGA Tour.

Government

Warren operates under a Mayor-council government system. William "Doug" Franklin has been the mayor of Warren since November 2011. His current term expires on January 1, 2024.  Opponents of the Mayor-Council system have pushed the idea of a Charter government, arguing that this would allow the citizens of Warren to have a bigger say in the governance of the city. Opponents say that this would decrease productivity within the city government.

City Administration

Education

Children in Warren are served by the Warren City School District. The current schools serving Warren include four PreK-8 Schools: Jefferson PK-8 School, Lincoln PK-8 School, McGuffey PK-8 School, and Willard PK-8 School. Grades 9 through 12 attend Warren G. Harding High School. The Roman Catholic Diocese of Youngstown also operates the private John F. Kennedy Catholic School, with a Lower Campus for grades kindergarten through 5 and an Upper Campus for grades 6 through 12.

Media
Warren is home to the Tribune Chronicle, a daily local newspaper serving Warren and its vicinity in Trumbull County. It traces its history to the Trump of Fame in 1812, the first newspaper in what had been the Connecticut Western Reserve. In 2008, USA Today reported daily circulation of 35,471 for the Tribune Chronicle.

Warren is part of the Youngstown media market, and is served by Youngstown-based television and radio stations. AM stations WHKZ and WHTX are based in Warren.

Notable people

 Roger Ailes, American television executive
 Red Ames, Major League Baseball player
 David Arnold, University of Michigan and NFL football player
 Catherine Bach, actress
 James L. Baughman, historian
 Andrew John Berger, ornithologist
 Carolina Bermudez, radio personality on Elvis Duran and the Morning Show in New York
 Earl Derr Biggers, novelist and playwright
 Bud Boone, auto racer
 Aaron Brown, Ohio State University and NFL player
 Joey Browner, USC and NFL player
 Keith Browner, USC and NFL player
 Ross Browner, Notre Dame and NFL player, College Football Hall of Famer
 Prescott Burgess, University of Michigan and NFL player with Baltimore Ravens
 Michael Capellas, former CEO Of Compaq Computer Corporation
 Genevieve R. Cline, federal judge
 Chris Columbus, filmmaker
 Kenyon Cox, American painter, illustrator, muralist, writer and teacher
 Joseph S. Curtis, Wisconsin State Assemblyman and lawyer
 Doug Datish, Ohio State University and NFL player
 Alaska Packard Davidson, First Female FBI special agent
 Van DeCree, Ohio State University and World Football League player
 Linda DeScenna, film set decorator
 Jerry Douglas, Grammy Award-winning musician
 Thomas Fagan, psychologist
 Elizabeth George, novelist, creator of The Inspector Lynley Mysteries
 Randy Gradishar, Ohio State University and NFL player
 Dave Grohl, musician
 John Harsh, Wisconsin State Assembly
 David Herron, NFL player
 Hugh Hewitt, radio talk show host
 Sean Jones, jazz musician, composer, lead trumpeter for Jazz at Lincoln Center Orchestra
 Jason Kokrak, professional golfer on the PGA Tour
 Bill Kollar, Montana State and NFL player, NFL assistant coach
 Rex Lee, actor, Entourage
 Braeden Lemasters, musician Wallows, actor 
 Mario Manningham, University of Michigan and NFL player
 Zella McBerty, Businesswoman and engineer in electric welding machine production
 Robin McKinley, fantasy author
 Antwaun Molden, NFL player
 James Ward Packard and brother William Doud Packard, industrialists
 Johnny Ace Palmer, magician
 Ronald A. Parise, NASA astronaut
 Austin Pendleton, actor
 Greg Reeves, musician
 Carl Schmitt, artist and writer
 De'Veon Smith, NFL player
 Karl Singer, football player
 Korey Stringer, NFL player
 Tere Tereba, fashion designer, actress, writer
 Harriet Taylor Upton, first woman vice-chairman of the Republican National Committee
 Paul Warfield, Ohio State University and NFL player, NFL Hall of Famer
 Forrest Wilson, author, winner of the Pulitzer Prize for Biography or Autobiography
 Chris Zylka, actor, The Secret Circle

References

External links

 Warren's official website

 
Cities in Ohio
Cities in Trumbull County, Ohio
Populated places established in 1798
County seats in Ohio
1798 establishments in the Northwest Territory
Western Reserve, Ohio